{{DISPLAYTITLE:C12H16N4O4}}
The molecular formula C12H16N4O4 (molar mass: 280.28 g/mol, exact mass: 280.1172 u) may refer to:

 4,4'-Azobis(4-cyanopentanoic_acid) (ACPA)
 MK-608